Stanley Chow is an artist and illustrator from Manchester, England.

Early life and education
Chow was born in 1974 and raised in Manchester by parents who had emigrated to England from Hong Kong. He grew up in a chip shop and says that living in this environment helped him to become an artist. Speaking to the BBC in 2014 Chow said “the reason why I am an illustrator is because growing up, the only form of amusement I had was with a biro and chip paper. I didn't really have many toys when I was a nipper, all I did was draw and draw and draw.”

He was educated at King's School in Macclesfield and during his time there Chow was inspired by his sixth form art teacher Robin Hidden who was himself an illustrator. Chow went on to study at Swindon College of Art on a course which included an exchange placement in Lyon, France.

Back in Manchester, Chow worked for a time as a club DJ, regularly playing venues including The Roadhouse and The Night and Day Cafe. Whilst out drinking, Chow would spend time entertaining himself by sketching his friends, who included Elbow's Guy Garvey, using simple line strokes which would eventually become the defining style of his work.

Career
Early work included creating fashion illustrations for teen magazines Just Seventeen and Sugar but when his father bought him a computer it changed the way he worked as Chow found himself being able to send work to clients digitally. He moved away from drawing and painting and started creating vector-based work using Illustrator, becoming a full-time illustrator in 2006. However, it was in 2007 that his career really took off when his art was spotted by musicians Meg and Jack White from the band The White Stripes. Chow had made a mock poster for the band and Meg and Jack liked it. Months later he was commissioned to create artwork for their Icky Thump album and he designed a limited edition USB flash drive which was later nominated for a Grammy Award in the 'Best Boxed or Special Limited Edition Package' category.

Portraits
Much of Chow's work is portraiture, with him specialising in images of celebrities from the worlds of music, television, film and sport. The people he selects to illustrate are spontaneous choices although Chow's love of football can be seen through the amount of portraits he has done of footballers, and his work is influenced by the Panini football stickers which he collected as a child in the 1980s. As a lifelong Manchester United fan Chow also agreed to illustrate poet Tony 'Longfella' Walsh's poem The Govan Boy which was written in tribute to Manchester United football manager Alex Ferguson. The pair both met Ferguson and discussed the project on BBC Radio Manchester.

Commissioned Work
Chow produces work for a wide range of clients including local businesses and internationally recognised brands. Throughout Manchester his work can be seen at Metrolink tram stops promoting Transport for Greater Manchester’s Get Me There travel card scheme and in 2014 and 2015 Chow's illustrations were commissioned by the Modern Designers agency to promote Chinese New Year celebrations in the city.

Internationally, Chow's clients include Saatchi & Saatchi, McDonald's, WWE and Wired magazine. He also regularly supplies illustrations to The New Yorker magazine and as well as producing images for articles has created portraits of a number of The New Yorker's featured contributing staff.

In 2014, he illustrated a set of characters for advertising agency Leo Burnett UK's long term Little Piccadilly interactive campaign for McDonald's. The campaign enabled people to create their own animated characters using their smart phones, which could then be sent live to the McDonald's screen in Piccadilly, London.

During that same year he was also invited to the Lego headquarters in Billund, Denmark, where he provided lectures and workshops to graphic designers there. Chow has continued to work with Lego and at the start of 2015 was presented with a Lego mini figure of himself which he had designed.

2015 also saw Chow design one of his most high-profile commissions to date. On 4 October, The New York Times Magazine cover featured a photograph of a metallic helium balloon depicting the face of Presidential hopeful Donald Trump. The balloon was designed by Chow and then photographed floating away on a white background by Jamie Chung. The project was turned around in the space of a week with Chow being commissioned on the same day that the idea was thought up. Rather than making an illustration of a balloon which could be photoshopped, Design Director Gail Bichler and her team decided to manufacture an actual balloon which could be inflated, so 25 were produced in order for them to be photographed in different ways. The cover was well received with it gaining 71% of votes in Adweek's weekly magazine 'Cover Battle' although in an interview with GQ Magazine Trump referred to the cover as "ridiculous". The following year the cover went on to win a gold medal from The Society for News Design in their annual awards, in the '12C Magazines, Cover Design' category with judges describing the illustration as "Playful, fun, timely, tells a story, also timeless".

Exhibitions
In June 2014, Chow launched his first UK solo retrospective which was held at the Centre for Chinese Contemporary Art in Manchester's Northern Quarter. Chow reflected on his upbringing in a chip shop by turning the window of the arts centre into a takeaway shop front. At the end of the exhibition all the works were sold on a first-come, first-served basis at takeaway prices with buyers being able to remove the art from the walls and take it home immediately. All proceeds went to the CFCCA artistic programme.

In early 2016, Chow announced plans to return to the Centre for Chinese Contemporary Art for a follow up exhibition which would take place for six months from February as part of the centre's 30th anniversary celebrations. The new exhibition, entitled InStangram would follow on from Chow's previous Takeaway exhibition by presenting 30 new designs featuring food, locations and objects inspired by Chow's experiences of growing up as an English-born Chinese man in Manchester.

References

External links 
  Stanley Chow Illustration Website
 Stanley Chow Twitter
 Stanley Chow Instagram
 Short film interview with Stanley Chow

1974 births
British illustrators
English illustrators
Artists from Manchester
Living people
British people of Chinese descent
English people of Chinese descent